Hunting magic is the magic associated with hunting  in hunter-gatherer cultures, both contemporary and prehistoric.

In rock art 
The hunting magic hypothesis, in the archaeology of rock art, is one of the functionalist approaches to explaining why rock art was created in ancient cultures. It originated from ethnographies of modern hunter-gatherers, who used their rock art in the hopes that it would improve their prowess on the hunt. The theory has been traditionally supported by violent imagery found in some rock art alongside animals.

In the history of religion 
Walter Burkert in Homo Necans (1972) suggested that rituals associated with hunting magic are at the origin of religion. Henri Breuil interpreted the paleolithic cave paintings as   hunting magic, meant to increase the number of animals. As an interpretation of religious-cultic practice of the Paleolithic, the concept of hunting magic is rejected by the majority of researchers today.

See also
Hunting hypothesis
Haiǁom people
Jeffers Petroglyphs
Rock carvings in Central Norway
The Sorcerer (cave art)
Great Mural Rock Art, Baja California

Notes

References 

Anthropology of religion
Magic (supernatural)
Hunting